Hurry is an unincorporated community in St. Mary's County, Maryland, United States.

History
A post office called Hurry was established in 1897, and remained in operation until 1959. The origin of the name "Hurry" is obscure.

References

Unincorporated communities in St. Mary's County, Maryland
Unincorporated communities in Maryland